In Islam, Jannah (pl.  jannāt,lit. "paradise, garden", is the final abode of the righteous. According to one count, the word appears 147 times in the Quran. Belief in the afterlife is one of the six articles of faith in Sunni and Twelver Shi'ism, a place where "believers" (Mumin) will enjoy pleasure, while the unbelievers (Kafir) will suffer in Jahannam. Both Jannah and Jahannam are believed to have several levels, in both cases, the higher the level, the more desirable -- in Jannah the higher the prestige and pleasure, in Jahannam the less the suffering. The afterlife experiences are described as physical, psychic and spiritual. Jannah is described with physical pleasures such as gardens, beautiful houris, wine that has no aftereffects, and "divine pleasure". Their reward of pleasure will vary according to the righteousness of the person. The characteristics of Jannah often have direct parallels with those of Jahannam. The pleasure and delights of Jannah described in the Quran, are matched by the excruciating pain and horror of Jahannam.

Jannah is also referred to as the abode of Adam and Eve, before they have been expelled. Most Muslims hold that Jannah (as well as Jahannam) coexist with the temporal world, rather than being created after Judgement Day. Although humans may not pass the boundaries to the otherworld, the otherworld may interact with the temporal world of humans.

Terminology
Jannah is found frequently in the  Qur'an (2:30, 78:12) and often translated as "Heaven" in the sense of an abode where believers are rewarded in afterlife. Another word,  samāʾ (usually pl. samāwāt) is also found frequently in the Quran and translated as "heaven", but in the sense of the sky above or celestial sphere.  (It is often used in the phrase as-samawat wal-ard  "the heavens and the earth", an example being Q.38:10.) The Quran describes both samāʾ and jannah as being above us.

Jannah is also frequently translated as "paradise". But another term with a more direct connection to that term is also found. , the literal term meaning paradise  was borrowed from the Persian word , being also the source of the English word "paradise", is used in verses Q.18:107 and  Q.23:11. "Firdaus" also designates the highest level of heaven.

There are many words in the Arabic language for both Heaven and Hell and those words also appear in the Quran and hadith. Most of them have become part of the Islamic belief.

Jannah is also used as the name of the Garden of Eden, where Adam and Hawa (Eve) dwelt.

Salvation/inhabitants

Scholars do not all agree on who will end up in Jannah, and the criteria for whether or not they will. Issues include whether all Muslims, even those who've committed major sins, will end up in Jannah; whether any non-Muslims will go there or all go to Jahannam.

Inhabitants according to the Quran
The Quran specifies the qualities for those allowed to inhabit Jannah (according to Smith and Haddad) as: "those who refrain from doing evil, keep their duty, have faith in God's revelations, do good works, are truthful, penitent, heedful, and contrite of heart, those who feed the needy and orphans and who are prisoners for God's sake."
Another source (Sebastian Günther and Todd Lawson) gives as the basic criterion for salvation in the afterlife more detail on articles of faith: the belief in the oneness of God, angels, revealed books, messengers, as well as repentance to God, and doing good deeds (amal salih). All these qualities are qualified by the doctrine that ultimately salvation can only be attained through God's judgment.
Jinn and angels
The idea that jinn as well as humans could find salvation was widely accepted,  based on the Quran (Q.55:74) where the saved are promised maidens "untouched before by either men or jinn" -- suggesting to classical scholars al-Suyūṭī and al-Majlisī that jinn also are provided their own kind of houri maidens in paradise.  Like humans, their destiny in the hereafter depends on whether they accept God's guidance. Angels, on the other hand, because they are not subject to desire and so are not subject to temptation, work in paradise serving the "blessed" (humans and jinn)  guiding them, officiating marriages, conveying messages, praising them, etc.
Salvation of non-Muslims
Muslim scholars disagree about exact criteria for salvation of  Muslim and non-Muslim. Although most agree that Muslims will be finally saved -- shahids (martyrs) who die in battle, are expected to enter paradise immediately after death -- non-Muslims are another matter.

Muslim scholars arguing in favor of  non-Muslims' being able to enter paradise cite the verse:
 "Indeed, those who believed and those who were Jews or Christians or Sabians—those who believed in Allah and the Last Day and did righteousness—will have their reward with their Lord, and no fear will there be concerning them, nor will they grieve," (Q.).
Those arguing against non-Muslim salvation regard this verse to have applied only until the arrival of Muhammad, after which it was abrogated  by another verse:
 "And whoever desires other than Islam as religion—never will it be accepted from him, and he, in the Hereafter, will be among the losers. (Q.).

Historically the Ash'ari school of theology was known for having an optimistic perspective on salvation for Muslims, but a very pessimistic view of those who heard about Muhammad and his character, yet rejected him. The Maturidi school also generally agreed that even sinners among Muslims would eventually enter paradise, but its unclear whether they thought only Muslim would go to Jannah, or if non-Muslims who understood and obeyed "God's universal law" would be saved also. The Muʿtazila school held that free will and individual accountability was necessary for Divine justice, thus  rejecting the idea of  intercession (Shafa'a) by Muhammad on behalf of sinners. Unlike other schools it believed Jannah and Jahannam would be created only after Judgement Day.  Like most Sunni, Shia Islam hold that all Muslims will eventually go to Jannah,
and like the Ash'ari school, believe heedless and stubborn unbelievers will go to hell, while those ignorant of the truth of Islam but "truthful to their own religion", will not. Modernist scholars Muhammad Abduh and Rashid Rida rejected the notion that the People of the Book are excluded from Jannah, referring to another verse.
 ˹Divine grace is˺ neither by your wishes nor those of the People of the Book! Whoever commits evil will be rewarded accordingly, and they will find no protector or helper besides Allah. But those who do good—whether male or female—and have faith will enter Paradise and will never be wronged ˹even as much as˺ the speck on a date stone. (Q.4:123-124)

Descriptions, details, organization

Sources 
Sources on Jannah include the Quran,  Islamic traditions, creeds, Quranic commentaries (tafsir) and "other theological writing".
"Third Islamic century traditionalists amplified the eschatological material enormously particularly in areas on where "the Quran is relatively silent" about the nature of Jannah.  Some of the more popular Sunni  manuals of eschatology are Kitāb al-rūḥ of  Ibn Qayyim al-Jawzīyaand al-Durra al-fākhira ft kashf 'ulūm al-ākhira of Abǖ Ḥāmid al-Ghazālī.

Delights
Inside Jannah, the Quran says the saved "will have whatever they wish for, forever"; (Q.25:16). Other verses give more specific descriptions of the delights of paradise:
'And whoever is in awe of standing before their Lord will have two Gardens
... ˹Both will be˺ with lush branches.
... In each ˹Garden˺ will be two flowing springs.
... In each will be two types of every fruit.
... Those ˹believers˺ will recline on furnishings lined with rich brocade. And the fruit of both Gardens will hang within reach.
... In both ˹Gardens˺ will be maidens of modest gaze, who no human or jinn has ever touched before.
... Those ˹maidens˺ will be ˹as elegant˺ as rubies and coral.
... Is there any reward for goodness except goodness?
... And below these two ˹Gardens˺ will be two others.
... Both will be dark green.
... In each will be two gushing springs.
... In both will be fruit, palm trees, and pomegranates.
... In all Gardens will be noble, pleasant mates
...˹They will be˺ maidens [houris] with gorgeous eyes, reserved in pavilions.
.... No human or jinn has ever touched these ˹maidens˺ before.
... All ˹believers˺ will be reclining on green cushions and splendid carpets.
Then which of your Lord's favours will you both deny? (Q.55:46-76, Mustafa Khattab, the Clear Quran)

Smith and Haddad summarize some of the Quranic pleasures:
Choirs of angels will sing in Arabic (the only language used in paradise), the streets will be as familiar as those of the dwellers' own countries, inhabitants will eat and drink 100 times more than earthly bodies could hold and will enjoy it 100 times more, their rooms will have thick carpets and brocade sofas, on Fridays they will go to a market to receive new clothing to enhance their beauty, they will not suffer bodily ailments or be subject to functions such as sleeping, spitting, or excreting; they will be forever young.

As the gates of Jannah are opened for the arrival of the saved into Jannah  they will be greeted (Q.39:73) by angels announcing, "Peace be upon you, because ye have endured with patience; how excellent a reward is paradise!" (Q13:24).

Inside there will be neither too much heat nor bitter cold; there will be fountains (Q.88:10), abundant shade from spreading tree branches green with foliage (Q.53:14-16, also Q.36:56–57).  They will be passed a cup (Q.88:10–16) full of wine "wherefrom they will get [no] aching of the head” (hangovers) [Q.56:19], and "which leads to no idle talk or sinfulness" (Q.52:23),
and every meat (Q.52:22) and  trees from which an unceasing supply of fruits grow (Q.36:56–57),  "that looks similar ˹but tastes different˺";(Q.2:25) adornment with golden and pearl bracelets (Q.35:33) and green garments of fine silk and brocade (Q.18:31); attended upon by [ghulman] (Q.52:24), servant-boys (eternal youths (56:17, 74:19)) like spotless pearls (Q.52:24).

While the Quran never mentions God being in the Garden, the faithful are promised the opportunity to gaze upon His face, something the inhabitants of the Fire will be deprived of.

Inhabitants will rejoice in the company of any parents, spouses, and children who were admitted to paradise (Q52:21) —conversing and recalling the past.

Non-physical pleasures
While the Quran is full of "graphic" descriptions of the "physical pleasures" for the inhabitants of the Garden, it also states that the "acceptance
[riḍwān] from God" felt by the inhabitants "is greater" than the pleasure of the Gardens (Q.9:72),  the true beauty of paradise, the greatest of all rewards, surpassing all other joys.  On the day on which God brings the elect near to his throne,  "some faces shall be shining in contemplating their Lord".

The visit is described as Muhammad leading the men and Fatimah leading the women to approach the Throne, "which is described as a huge esplanade of musk". As "the veil of light before the Throne lifts, God appears with the radiance of the full moon, and His voice can be heard saying, 'Peace be upon you.'"

Hadith include stories of the saved being served an enormous feast where "God Himself is present to offer to His faithful ones delicacies kneaded into a kind of pancake". In another series of narratives, God personally invites the inhabitants of Jannah "to visit with Him every Friday".

Houri

"Perhaps no aspect of Islamic eschatology has so captured the imagination" of both "Muslims and non-Muslims" as houri (ḥūr). Men will get untouched Houri in paradise (Q55:56), virgin companions of equal age (56:35-38) and have large, beautiful eyes (37:48). Houri have occasioned "spectacular elaborations" by later Islamic eschatological writers, but also "some derision by insensitive Western observers and critics of Islam".

The Quran also states the saved "will have pure spouses," (without indicating gender) (Q2:25, Q4:57), accompanied by any children that did not go to Jahannam (Q52:21), and attended to by servant-boys with the spotless appearance similar to a protected pearls (Q52:24).

Despite the Quranic description above, Houris  have been described as women who will accompany faithful Muslims in Paradise. Muslim scholars differ as to whether they refer to the believing women of this world or a separate creation, with the majority opting for the latter.

Size, geography, structure

The Qur'an describes paradise as  a "great kingdom" (Q.76:20) stretching out over and above the entire world, and "lofty" (Q.69:22).

Paradise is "as vast as the heavens and the earth" (Q.3:133). There are four rivers: one each of water, milk, honey, and wine (47:15). (They were later identified as Kawthar, Kafur, Tasnim, and Salsabil.)

Despite the details given in the Quran about Jannah/Garden, "nowhere" is there found "an ordered picture of the structure" of the abode. "For the most part Islamic theology has not concerned itself with questions about the location and structure of the Garden and the Fire on the understanding that only God knows these particulars."

Layers/levels
Many sources agree that paradise has "various degrees and levels". One conservative Salafi source, quotes as evidence a sahih hadith where Muhammad reassures the mother of a martyr, “O Umm Haarithah, there are gardens in Paradise ... and your son has attained the highest Firdaws”, indicating a hierarchy of levels, but does not how many there are.
On the basis of "several scriptural suggestions", scholars have created "a very detailed structure" of paradise, but there is more than one, and not all of the traditions on location of paradise and hell "are easily pictured or indeed mutually reconcilable".

For example,  Q.23:17 states: "We created above you seven paths [Ṭarā'iq]", from which is drawn a heaven of seven tiers (which is also "a structure familiar to Middle Eastern cosmogony since the early Babylonian days"). Another school of thought insists Jannah actually has "eight layers or realms" as the Quran gives "eight different names ... for the abode of the blessed".  

Some descriptions of Jannah/the Garden indicate that the most spacious and highest part of the Garden,  is Firdaws which is directly under the Throne, and the place from which the four rivers of Paradise flow. Others say the uppermost portion is either the Garden of Eden or 'Iliyi, and that is the second level from the top.

Another possibility is that there are four separate realms of the blessed, of which either Firdaws or Eden is the uppermost. This is based on Surah 55,
which talks about two Gardens: ("As for him who fears standing before his Lord there are two Gardens [Jannatan]") [S 55:46). All descriptions following
this verse are of things in pairs, (i.e. in the Arabic dual form) -- two fountains flowing, fruit of every kind
in pairs, beside these two other gardens with two springs (Q.55:62,66).

Still others have proposed that the seven levels suggested by the Qur'an are the seven heavens, above which is the Garden or final abode of felicity, while many see paradise as only one entity with many names. (According to one source -- a member of the fatwa team at Islamweb.net -- only God knows the exact number of the levels of Paradise, but reliable hadith say the number of levels of Jannah may be the same as the number of verses in the Quran, i.e. over 6000 verses.)

One version of the layered Garden conceptualization describes
the highest level of heaven (al-firdaws) as being said to be so close that its inhabitants could hear the sound of God's throne above. This exclusive location is where the messengers, prophets, Imams, and martyrs (shahids) dwell.  Al-Suyuti and Kitāb aḥwāl al-qiyāma each gives names to the levels that don't always coincide (see table to right).

{| class="wikitable floatright"
|-
! colspan="2" |Gates of Jannah according to different sources
|-
! Soubhi El-Saleh
! Huda Omam Khalid
|-
|salat (prayer)|| :For those who were punctual in prayer
|-
|jihad (holy war)||:For those who took part in jihad
|-
|almsgiving||:For those who gave charity more often
|-
|sawm (fasting)||:For those who fasted (siyam)
|-
|repentance||:For those who participated in the annual pilgrimage
|-
|self-control||:For those who withheld their anger and forgave others
|-
|submission||:For those who by virtue of their faith are saved from reckoning and chastisement
|-
|the door reserved for those whose entry to Paradise will be without preliminary judgment||  :For those who showed zeal in remembering Allah  
|-
!<small>Source: Soubhi El-Saleh, based on numerous traditions<ref>Soubhi El-Saleh (La Vie Future selon le Coran. Paris: Librarie Philosophique J. Vrin, 1971, chapter 1, pt. 3); cited in Smith & Haddad, Islamic Understanding,  1981: pp.217-218 note 77</ref></small>
! Sources: Doors of JannahIslam KaZir
|}

Gates/doors
Two verses of the Quran (Q.7:40, 39:73) mention "gates" or "doors" (using the plural form) as the entrance of paradise, but say nothing about their number, names or any other characteristics.
 "To those who reject Our signs and treat them with arrogance, no opening will there be of the gates of heaven ..." (Q.7:40)
 "And those who kept their duty to their Lord (Al-Muttaqoon – the pious) will be led to Paradise in groups till when they reach it, and its gates will be opened" (Q.39:73)
As in the case of the levels of Jannah, later sources elaborate, giving names and functions but don't agree on all details (see table to right).

In traditions, each level of the  eight principal gates of Paradise is described as generally being divided into a hundred degrees guarded by angels (in some traditions Ridwan). Entrants will be greeted by angels with salutations of peace or As-Salamu Alaykum.

Jannah is accessible vertically through its gates (Q.7:40), by ladders (ma'arij) (Q.70:3), or sky-ropes (asbab). However, only select beings such as angels and prophets can enter. Iblis (Satan) and devils are kept at bay by angels who throw stars at them, whenever they try to climb back to heaven  (Q.37:6-10). Notably and contrary to many Christian ideas on heaven, God (Allah) does not reside in paradise. 

Rivers
A few hadith name four rivers in paradise, or coming from paradise, as: Saihan (Syr Darya), Jaihan (Amu Darya), Furat (Euphrates) and Nil (Nile). Salsabil is the name of a spring that is the source of the rivers of Rahma (mercy) and Al-Kawthar (abundance). Sidrat al-Muntaha is a Lote tree that marks the end of the seventh heaven, the boundary where no angel or human can pass. Muhammad is supposed to have taken a pomegranate from jannah, and shared it with Ali, as recorded by Nasir al-Din al-Tusi. However, some scholars, like Ghazali, reject that Muhammad took the fruit, argued he had only a vision instead.

Literal or allegorical
According to scholars Jane I. Smith, Yvonne Y. Haddad, while there are Muslims of a "philosophical or mystical"
bent who interpret descriptions of heaven and hell "metaphorically", "the vast majority of believers", understand verses of the Quran on Jannah (and hellfire) "to be real and specific, anticipating them" with joy or terror, although this view "has generally not insisted that the realities of the next world will be identical with those of this world".
Besides the material notion of the paradise, descriptions of it are also interpreted as allegories, whose meaning is the state of joy believers will experience in the afterlife. For some theologians, seeing God is not a question of sight, but of awareness of God's presence. Although early Sufis, such as Hallaj, took the descriptions of Paradise literal, later Sufi traditions usually stressed out the allegorical meaning.

Eternal not temporal
While some Quranic verses suggest hellfire is eternal and some that its punishment "will not necessarily be forever", verses on Jannah are less ambiguous.  Eternality assured in verses about paradise such as Q.3:198, 4:57, and 57:12, (which say that the righteous will be khālidūn fīhā [eternally in it]), and Q.35:35, which describes the reward of dār al-maqāma [the abode of everlastingness]. Consequently, neither "theologians nor the traditionalists" have had any doubts about the eternal nature of paradise or the residence of the righteous in it.Smith & Haddad, Islamic Understanding,  1981: p.93

Other characteristics
One of the characteristics of Jannah (like hellfire) is that events are not "frozen in one eternal moment", but form cycles of "endless repetition" and "unceasing self renewing clockwork", as described by classical scholars on the afterlife  al-Suyūṭī and al-Majlisī. For example, when a fruit is plucked from a tree, a new fruit immediately appears to takes its place; when a hungry inhabitant sees a bird whose meat they would like to eat it falls already roasted into their hands, and after they are done eating the bird "regains its form shape and flies away"; not only do houri regain their virginity after being deflowered by one of the saved, they grow like fruit on trees or plants on the land and "whenever one of them is taken" by one of the saved in paradise one for his pleasure, "a new one springs forth in her place". (So too, in hellfire are the skin of the damned replaced each time they are burned off by the fire to be burned again, and drowning sinners driven back into the sea by giant snakes and scorpions every time they reach the safety of shore.)

 Garden of Eden and Paradise 

Muslim scholars differ on whether the Garden of Eden, in which Adam and Eve (Adam and Hawwa) dwelled before being expelled by God, is the same as the afterlife abode of the righteous believers, i.e. paradise. Most scholars in the early centuries of Islamic theology and the centuries onwards thought it was and that this indicated that paradise was located on earth. It was argued that when God commanded Adam to "go down" (ihbit) from the garden, this did not indicate a vertical movement (such as "falling" from a heaven above to earth), but instead was used in the same sense as Moses telling Israelites to "go down to Egypt". However, over the centuries as paradise came to be thought of more and more as "a transcendent, otherworldy realm", the idea of it being located somewhere on earth fell out of favor. The Garden of Eden, on the other hand lacked many transcendent, otherworldy characteristics. Al-Balluti (887 – 966) reasoned that the Garden of Eden lacked the perfection and eternal character of a final paradise: Adam and Eve lost the primordial paradise, while the paradisiacal afterlife lasts forever; if Adam and Eve were in the otherworldly paradise, the devil (Shaiṭān) could not have entered and deceive them, since there is no evil or idle talk in paradise; Adam slept in his garden, but there is no sleep in paradise.

Many adherences of the Muʿtazila, also refused to identify Adam's abode with paradise, because they argued that paradise and hell would not be created until after Day of Judgement, an idea proposed by Dirar b. Amr. Most Muslim scholars, however, assert that paradise and hell have been created already and coexists with the contemporary world, taking evidence from the Quran, Muhammad's heavenly journey, and the life in the graves.

Islamic exegesis does not regard Adam and Eve's expulsion from paradise as punishment for disobedience or a result from abused free will on their part, but as part of God's wisdom (ḥikma'') and plan for humanity to experience  the full range of his attributes, his love, forgiveness, and power to his creation. By experiencing hardship, they better appreciate paradise and its delights. Khwaja Abdullah Ansari (1006–1088) describes Adam and Eve's expulsion as ultimately caused by God, since man has no choice but to comply to God's will. But this does not mean that complying is not a "sin" and that humans should not blame themselves for it. This is exemplified by Adam and Eve in the Quran (Q.7:23  “Our Lord! We have wronged ourselves. If You do not forgive us and have mercy on us, we will certainly be losers.”)

Comparison with other religions

Comparison with Judaism
Jannah shares the name "Garden of the Righteous" with the Jewish concept of paradise. In addition, paradise in Judaism is described as a garden, much like the Garden of Eden, where people live and walk and dance with God and his angels, wear garments of light, and eat the fruit of the tree of life. Like the feast of Jannah, Jewish eschatology describes the messiah holding a Seudat nissuin, called the Seudat Chiyat HaMatim, with the righteous of every nation at the end time.

Comparison with Christianity
Jesus in the Gospels uses various images for heaven that are similarly found in Jannah: feast, mansion, throne, and paradise. In Jannah, humans stay as humans. However, the Book of Revelation describes that in heaven Christ “will transform our lowly bodies so that they will be like his glorious body” (Philippians 3:21). God (Allah) does not reside in paradise or heaven. However, in Christianity, the new heavens and earth will be a place where God dwells with humans.

See also
 Elysium
 Garden of Eden
 Islamic eschatology
 Isra and Mi'raj
 Rawdah ash-Sharifah

References

Explanatory notes

Citations

Bibliography

External links 

 
Islamic eschatology
Conceptions of heaven
Islamic terminology